John Marshall (28 December 1797 – 31 October 1836) was an English politician, the Member of Parliament for Leeds (1832–1835).  He was the second son of the wealthy industrialist John Marshall who introduced major innovations in flax spinning and built the celebrated Marshall's Mill and Temple Works in Leeds, West Yorkshire.  His eldest brother William was MP for Beverley,  Carlisle and East Cumberland and his next younger brother James Garth was a later MP for Leeds. The fourth brother, Henry Cowper, was Mayor of Leeds in 1842–1843.

Marshall married Mary Dykes, daughter of Joseph Ballantyne Dykes from Cockermouth, Cumbria, and they had five children.  Their youngest son Julian was a noted music and print collector and writer.

References

External links 
 

1797 births
1836 deaths
UK MPs 1832–1835
Members of the Parliament of the United Kingdom for English constituencies
Politicians from Leeds
Committee members of the Society for the Diffusion of Useful Knowledge